Poolhall Junkies is a 2002 drama, thriller, and sports film co-written, starring, and directed by Mars Callahan.

The film also features Alison Eastwood, Michael Rosenbaum, Rick Schroder, Rod Steiger (in his final film role), Chazz Palminteri, and Christopher Walken. It is the story of a pool hustler who is opposed by his former mentor, with a new prodigy, in a climactic big-stakes nine-ball match.

Plot 
Most of the film takes place in a pool hall run by Nick (Rod Steiger). Obsessed by the world of pool, Johnny (Mars Callahan) could be one of the best. But his mentor Joe (Chazz Palminteri), a shady , trains Johnny as a hustler, and decides how and who Johnny plays. Unbeknownst to Johnny, Joe has been holding him back from his dream: playing in the legitimate pro tour.  When Johnny finally learns that Joe intercepted and threw away an invitation for Johnny to join the pro tour, he breaks from Joe, throwing a game with a large .  Losing both that stake money and his hustler income source sparks Joe to violence, and he breaks Johnny's  hand outside the pool hall (an homage to a similar scene in the classic pool film The Hustler).  Joe is later beaten up by some of Johnny's friends as a warning to leave him alone.

After an ultimatum from his girlfriend Tara (Alison Eastwood), Johnny largely leaves the world of pool hustling, and finally commits to a "real" job in the construction business, but is soon miserable there. He finds himself spending most of his time with his younger brother Danny (Michael Rosenbaum), a musician with aspirations of following in Johnny's hustler footsteps, despite Johnny's discouragement of this path.  Johnny meets Tara's wealthy uncle, Mike (Christopher Walken); he and Johnny hustle some of Mike's business associates, one an executive at Tara's employer. Rather than bet money or on himself, Johnny wagers a high-placed position for Tara, with Mike putting up an expensive car as their side of the stake.  Johnny wins a challenging trick-shot bet (to duplicate a difficult shot Mike had made in the previous game), and the promotion for Tara, but keeps the reason for her new opportunity a secret. (She eventually figures out the reason behind her advancement to such a competitive position, but understands that Johnny was just trying to help her the only way he knew how.)

As for Joe, he is bent on revenge for the beating he took, and soon he has a new protégé, Brad (Rick Schroder), who is just as good as, if not better, than Johnny. Brad and Danny play a high-stakes game of pool which ends in a huge debt owed to Joe by Danny, who was no match for Brad. Johnny later finds that his brother is in jail for trying to steal the money he owes, and that Joe is going to come after Johnny for the money. The only way out is for Johnny to play against Brad for an even larger sum – to pay off Joe and fund his brother's legal defense. This results in a -to-nine showdown that pits two of the greatest players against each other for a large sum of money – and perhaps even for Johnny and Danny's lives. One of the brothers' affluent friends puts up some of the stake money, and Mike provides the rest, then even increases the stakes. During a tense time-out, Mike delivers a memorable monologue (in Walken's intense style, as most famously used in Pulp Fiction), likening Johnny to a slumbering lion whose time has come to rise up and chase off the hyenas and jackals. Mike then raises the stakes, to a level that will bankrupt Joe if Brad loses.

The match comes down to a very difficult final shot for Brad. Johnny s Brad while he is calculating how to take the shot, telling him how easy the shot is and how Johnny would even pay to take that shot for him. Smelling an opportunity to get more money from Johnny, Joe agrees and makes Brad let Johnny attempt the shot.  Johnny does so, but does not  the final ball. As Brad prepares to take the winning shot, Johnny stops him: since he paid for the privilege of taking Brad's turn for him, it is now Johnny's own turn again.  Before Brad or Joe can react, Johnny easily pockets the last ball and wins the match, having exploited the hustling techniques he learned from Joe to do so.  Joe is prepared to resort to violence again, but Johnny predicted this and has the same friends who roughed up Joe before drag him away.  Brad stays out of it, and on his way out of the pool hall suggests Johnny should get onto the pro tour.  In the closing shot, Johnny is shown happily playing a pro-tour match.  (The resolution of Danny's legal trouble is left as a loose end.)

Cast
Mars Callahan as Johnny Doyle
Chazz Palminteri as Joe
Rod Steiger as Nick
Michael Rosenbaum as Danny Doyle
Rick Schroder as Brad
Alison Eastwood as Tara
Christopher Walken as Uncle Mike
Mike Massey as St. Louis Louie
Richard Portnow as Toupee Jay
Chris Corso as Houseman
Robert LeBlanc as a tournament pro
Charlie Terrell as the guitar player in Danny's band
Ernie Reyes, Jr. as Tang
Glenn Plummer as Chico
Anson Mount as Chris
Phillip Glasser as Max

Production
There were no camera tricks or special film editing used for any of the billiards shots in the film, although many of the special trick shots were performed by professional player Robert "Cotton" Leblanc.  Mike Massey, another world-renowned trick shot performer, has a cameo appearance as "St. Louis" Louie in the film as well. Christopher Walken made the difficult trick shot to win a game against Tara's boss on the first take. He was supposed to make a "trial run" for the scene, but he asked that the cameras go ahead and roll, in case he happened to make it on his first try, and he did.

In real life Mars Callahan is an accomplished pool player who met co-writer Chris Corso in a pool hall where each was trying to hustle the other. After a bitterly contested game (neither will tell who actually won) the two became good friends. Swapping war stories about their mutual experiences playing pool, the two decided to write a script based on their experiences and observations. Two weeks later the script was completed, but it would take another ten years to get it to the big screen.

Filmed in Salt Lake City, Utah, the film includes several references to the Salt Lake Valley and prominently places the Salt Lake Temple in the background of a scene.

Reception
Poolhall Junkies received mostly negative reviews from critics: the review aggregator Rotten Tomatoes sampled 44 reviews, and gave the film a 34% positive rating.

References

External links 

Gold Circle Films

2002 films
Cue sports films
Films shot in Salt Lake City
American independent films
Films produced by Vincent Newman
Gold Circle Films films
2000s English-language films
Films directed by Mars Callahan
2000s American films